A handyman is a person competent in a variety of trade skills.

Handy Man may also refer to:

 "Handy Man" (song), a rock and roll song written by Jimmy Jones and Otis Blackwell
 " Handy Man", a song on the Magic of Love single, written and produced by Yasutaka Nakata and performed by the Japanese group Perfume
 "Handy-Man", a song on the Hannah med H Soundtrack by Swedish duo The Knife
 "Handy-Man", a nickname of Homo habilis, the earliest known species of the genus Homo, and likely ancestor of modern humans
 The Handy Man (1918 film), starring Oliver Hardy
 The Handyman (1920 film), written by Walter Forde
 The Handy Man (1923 film), starring Stan Laurel
 The Handyman (1980 film), a 1980 Canadian film
 , a British tug  in service from 1947 until 1966
  The Handyman (2018 film), an Italian film directed by Valerio Attanasio starring Sergio Castellitto

See also
 Handy Manny, a CGI-animated children's television series